Marcell Ozuna Idelfonso (born November 12, 1990), nicknamed "The Big Bear", is a Dominican professional baseball outfielder for the Atlanta Braves of Major League Baseball (MLB). He has previously played in MLB for the Miami Marlins and St. Louis Cardinals. He made his MLB debut in 2013 with the Marlins.

Ozuna was signed by the Marlins as an amateur free agent in 2008. He is a two-time MLB All-Star (2016, 2017), and won both a Gold Glove and a Silver Slugger Award in 2017, his breakout season. That year, he finished fourth in the National League (NL) in batting average (.312), and third in home runs (37) and runs batted in (124). Following the 2017 season, the Marlins traded Ozuna to the St. Louis Cardinals. In 2020 he led the NL in both home runs and RBIs.

Early life and family
Marcell Ozuna Idelfonso was born in Santo Domingo, Dominican Republic. His father is a former painter, and his mother is a housekeeper. He has one brother and two sisters. He is the cousin of former MLB player Pablo Ozuna.

Professional career

Minor leagues

On February 15, 2008, the Florida Marlins signed Ozuna as an international free agent with a $49,000 bonus. He played for the Dominican Summer League (DSL) Marlins that year, where in 63 games, he hit .279 with six home runs and 43 runs batted in (RBIs) and eight stolen bases. In 2009, he played for the GCL Marlins, where in 55 games, he hit .313 with five home runs and 39 RBIs.

Ozuna began 2010 with the Greensboro Grasshoppers of the Class A South Atlantic League, but was sidelined after six appearances with an injured wrist. He returned in June with Short Season Jamestown, where he finished the season. In 74 total games, he hit .258 with 22 home runs and 62 RBIs. Ozuna spent 2011 with Greensboro, where he hit .266 with 23 home runs, 71 RBIs, and 17 stolen bases over 131 games.

Ozuna was promoted to Jupiter Hammerheads of the Class A-Advanced Florida State League for the 2012 season, where in 129 games, he hit .266 with 24 home runs and 95 RBIs. That year, he led the Florida State League in home runs, RBIs, runs scored, and total bases. Ozuna was added to the Marlins' 40-man roster on November 20, 2012. Baseball America rated Ozuna the 75th-best prospect in baseball prior to the 2013 season.

Ozuna opened 2013 with Jupiter, but after four games, he was promoted to the Jacksonville Suns of the Class AA Southern League. Ozuna was named the league's player of the week on April 29, 2013. That same day, the Marlins promoted Ozuna to the major leagues following an injury to Giancarlo Stanton.

Miami Marlins (2013–2017)

On April 30, 2013, Ozuna made his major league debut, and recorded his first career hit, a single off Jeremy Hefner of the New York Mets. He hit his first career home run (as well as his first RBI and run scored), a solo home run, off Cole Hamels of the Philadelphia Phillies, in his fifth game. Ozuna was used as the starting right fielder in Stanton's absence. When Stanton returned, Ozuna became the starting center fielder. On July 22, Ozuna was optioned back to Jacksonville. Instead of joining Jacksonville, Ozuna was placed on the 15-day disabled list due to a ligament tear and avulsion fracture in his left thumb, which he injured while making a diving catch. On July 26, 2013, he underwent season-ending thumb surgery.

In 2014, Ozuna played a total of 153 games for the Marlins, batting .269 with 23 home runs and 85 RBIs. On September 11, 2014, he tied a franchise record with home runs in four consecutive games.

On July 5, 2015, Ozuna was sent down to AAA after going hitless in nine of ten games, dipping his average to .249 on the season. After playing 33 games and batting .333 with five home runs and 11 RBIs, he returned to the Marlins to complete the 2015 season, batting .278 with six home runs and 18 RBI.

During the off-season, the Marlins received several offers for him from other teams, but he was back on the roster for the 2016 season and inserted in the number-two spot in the lineup.

In 2017, Ozuna was named NL Player of the Week for the week of April 10–16 after batting .435 with four home runs, 12 RBIs, and a 1.481 OPS.

Ozuna was named a starter for the NL in the 2017 MLB All-Star Game. Of the NL All-Star selections, he was one of eight to hit at least 35 home runs, but Ozuna was one of just four to walk at a rate of at least nine percent while striking out less than 22 percent. He established career highs in numerous categories, including batting .312 with 37 home runs and 124 RBI. He was named the NL Player of the Week along with teammate Giancarlo Stanton once again for the week of September 18–24 after batting .500 (10–20) with three home runs, seven RBIs, and six runs scored.

St. Louis Cardinals (2018–2019)

On December 14, 2017, the Marlins traded Ozuna to the St. Louis Cardinals for Sandy Alcántara, Magneuris Sierra, Zac Gallen, and Daniel Castano. On January 12, 2018, it was announced that the Cardinals and Ozuna reached agreement on a one-year, $9 million contract. Prior to the 2018 season, Mike Petriello of MLB.com rated Ozuna the best left fielder in the major leagues, opining him as "a strong fielder," and averaging the 12th-highest exit velocity [] over the prior three seasons of all hitters with at least 1,000 plate appearances.

On June 2, 2018, Ozuna hit his 100th career home run off Chad Kuhl, in a 3–2 victory versus the Pittsburgh Pirates, and first home run at Busch Stadium as a member of the Cardinals. The following day, he hit a grand slam in a 5–0 win versus the Pirates.

He was named NL Player of the Week for the week of June 11–17, hitting .455/.478/1.000 (10-for-22, 1.478 OPS), with four home runs and eight RBIs in six games. This is his third Player of the Week award after winning it twice with the Miami Marlins during the 2017 season, in mid-April and early September. On July 30, 2018, at Busch Stadium versus the Colorado Rockies, Ozuna hit his first walk-off home run, a solo shot in the 10th inning, helping St. Louis defeat the Rockies 5–4. Ozuna finished his first season in St. Louis batting .280 with 23 home runs and 88 RBIs in 148 games.

Ozuna was placed on the injured list on June 29, 2019, with a finger fracture, and was activated on August 3. Over 130 regular season games and 485 at bats, Ozuna slashed .243/.330/.804 with 29 home runs and 89 RBIs.

With the Cardinals reaching the 2019 National League Division Series, Ozuna played in his first career postseason series. In the five games against the Atlanta Braves, Ozuna hit .429 with 9 hits and 5 RBI.

Atlanta Braves (2020–present)
On January 21, 2020, Ozuna signed a one-year contract worth $18 million with the Atlanta Braves.

On July 24, Ozuna was the starting left fielder, making his Braves debut on Opening Day. On September 1, he became the first National League player to hit three home runs in one game at Fenway Park, and also reached 1,000 MLB career hits. When Adam Duvall hit three home runs in the next game, also against the Boston Red Sox, Ozuna and Duvall became the first teammates in Major League Baseball history to have hit three home runs each in consecutive games.

In 2020 he batted .338/.431/.636 (each 3rd in the NL) with an NL-leading 18 home runs, 56 RBIs, and 145 total bases during the shortened 60-game season. Ozuna won his second Silver Slugger Award after the  season; it was the first-ever Silver Slugger for designated hitter in the National League as a result of the universal DH rule implemented league-wide during the COVID-19 pandemic-shortened 2020 season.

On February 5, 2021, Ozuna re-signed with the Braves with a four-year, $64 million deal. On September 9, Ozuna was put on administrative leave due to domestic violence allegations. He did not play for the remainder of the season. The Braves finished with an 88-73 record, clinching the NL East, and eventually won the 2021 World Series, their first title since 1995.

Personal life
Ozuna is married to Genesis Guzman. As of May 2017, the couple has three children.

On May 29, 2021, Ozuna was arrested and charged with aggravated assault by strangulation and battery after Sandy Springs Police witnessed him grabbing his wife by the neck and throwing her against a wall. The charges were later withdrawn after a review by the Fulton County District Attorney’s Office which concluded the charges didn’t agree with the video evidence. This resulted in Ozuna receiving a 20-game suspension which he served retroactively during the  season.

At 4 A.M. on August 19, 2022, Ozuna was arrested again and charged with driving under the influence after Norcross Police noticed his inability to stay in lane.

See also

 Atlanta Braves award winners and league leaders
 List of Major League Baseball players from the Dominican Republic
 Miami Marlins award winners and league leaders

References

External links

 

1990 births
Living people
Atlanta Braves players
Dominican Republic expatriate baseball players in the United States
Dominican Summer League Marlins players
Jacksonville Suns players
Jamestown Jammers players
Jupiter Hammerheads players
Gigantes del Cibao players
Gold Glove Award winners
Greensboro Grasshoppers players
Gulf Coast Marlins players
Major League Baseball designated hitters
Major League Baseball outfielders
Major League Baseball players from the Dominican Republic
Miami Marlins players
National League All-Stars
National League home run champions
National League RBI champions
Silver Slugger Award winners
St. Louis Cardinals players
Sportspeople from Santo Domingo